Marco Mellino (born 3 August 1966) is an Italian prelate of the Catholic Church who serves as Secretary of the Council of Cardinals. He has been a bishop since 2018 and worked as Adjunct Secretary to that Council from 2018 to 2020.

Biography 
Marco Mellino was born on 3 August 1966 in Canale, Italy. He entered the seminary in Alba in 1978. After earning his diploma there he earned a bachelor's degree in theology at the Interdiocesan Theological Studium of Fossano. He was ordained a priest of the Diocese of Alba on 29 June 1991 and fulfilled pastoral assignments in the parish of the Sacred Hearth of Jesus in Santo Stefano Belbo until 1997. He studied in Rome at the Pontifical Lateran University from 1997 to 2000, earning a licentiate in canon law in 1999 and a doctorate in canon law in 2000.

He returned to his home diocese to work as pastor of the parish of the Immaculate Conception in Piana Biglini and prosecuting judge at the Piedmont Regional Ecclesiastical Tribunal, based in Turin. He also taught canon law at the Interdiocesan Theological Studium in Fossano. From 2009 to 2018 he served as an external judge at the Court of Appeals of the Vicariate of Rome. From September 2006 to June 2018 he worked in the Section for General Affairs of the Secretariat of State and then returned to serve for a few months as vicar general in Alba.

Pope Francis appointed him Adjunct Secretary of the Council of Cardinals and Titular Bishop of Cresima on 27 October 2018. He named a member of the Pontifical Council for Legislative Texts. He was consecrated on 15 December 2018 at Alba Cathedral. Cardinal Pietro Parolin was the principal consecrator and Bishop Marcello Semeraro and Bishop Marco Brunetti were co–consecrators. Unlike the Secretary to that Council, who had other duties as Bishop of Albano, the Council was Mellino's only assignment, which was interpreted as a sign of the pope's desire to "stabilize" the Council.

On 15 October 2020, Pope Francis named him Secretary of the Council of Cardinals.

References 

Living people
1966 births
People from the Province of Cuneo
Bishops appointed by Pope Francis
21st-century Italian Roman Catholic bishops
Pontifical Lateran University alumni
Officials of the Roman Curia